This is a list of the 118 chemical elements that have been identified as of 2023. A chemical element, often simply called an element, is a type of atom which has the same number of protons in its atomic nucleus (i.e., the same atomic number, or Z).

The definitive visualisation of all 118 elements is the periodic table of the elements, whose history along the principles of the periodic law was one of the founding developments of modern chemistry.  It is a tabular arrangement of the elements by their chemical properties that usually uses abbreviated chemical symbols in place of full element names, but the linear list format presented here is also useful. Like the periodic table, the list below organizes the elements by the number of protons in their atoms; it can also be organized by other properties, such as atomic weight, density, and electronegativity. For more detailed information about the origins of element names, see List of chemical element name etymologies.

List

See also

 List of people whose names are used in chemical element names
 List of places used in the names of chemical elements
 List of chemical element name etymologies
 Roles of chemical elements

References

External links
Atoms made thinkable, an interactive visualisation of the elements allowing physical and chemical properties to be compared
Top 50 Elements, a quiz on the chemical symbols of the top 50 elements in the periodic table